The Anchorage Provincial Park is a public park located on the south-east coast of Grand Manan Island, New Brunswick, Canada. The island, the largest in the Bay of Fundy, is also the primary island in the Grand Manan Archipelago, sitting at the boundary between the Bay of Fundy and the Gulf of Maine.

Activities
The park offers a number of hiking and cycling trails. The Red Point Trail boardwalk is wheelchair accessible. Other trails are Long Pond, Great Pond and Bagley's. Individuals may also partake in sea kayaking, whale-watching and bird-watching at the park. As many as 275 different bird species can be seen on Grand Manan. The park has several blinds for bird viewing.

The park includes 100 campsites, tent cabins, showers, laundry facilities, kitchen shelter and barbecue pits.

See also
Bay of Fundy
Geography of New Brunswick
Grand Manan
New Brunswick

References

External links
The Anchorage Provincial Park

Provincial parks of New Brunswick
Geography of Charlotte County, New Brunswick
Tourist attractions in Charlotte County, New Brunswick
1970 establishments in New Brunswick